Chairon Ramon Isenia (born January 23, 1979, in Curaçao, Netherlands Antilles) is a Dutch baseball player.

Isenia represented the Netherlands at the 2000 Summer Olympics in Sydney where he and his team became fifth. Four years later at the 2004 Summer Olympics in Athens they were sixth.  He also played for the Netherlands in the inaugural World Baseball Classic held in 2006.

External links
Isenia at the Dutch Olympic Archive

1979 births
Baseball players at the 2000 Summer Olympics
Baseball players at the 2004 Summer Olympics
Living people
Olympic baseball players of the Netherlands
Dutch baseball players
Bakersfield Blaze players
Charleston RiverDogs players
Gulf Coast Devil Rays players
Hudson Valley Renegades players
Montgomery Biscuits players
Orlando Rays players
Princeton Devil Rays players
St. Petersburg Devil Rays players
Curaçao expatriate baseball players in the United States
2006 World Baseball Classic players